Alau is a village development committee in Parsa District in the Narayani Zone of southern Nepal. At the time of the 2011 Nepal census it had a population of 8566 people living in 1213 individual households. There were 4433 males and 4133 females at the time of the census. In 2014, it was included in sub-metropolitan city, Birgunj.

Dryport is also located in Alau.

References

Populated places in Parsa District